Lake Fenton may refer to a location in the United States:

Lake Fenton (Michigan), a lake
Lake Fenton, Michigan, a community adjacent to the lake
Lake Fenton High School

See also 
 Fenton Lake (disambiguation)